Sageretia (mock buckthorn or sageretia) is a genus of about 35 species of shrubs and small trees in the family Rhamnaceae, native to southern and eastern Asia and northeast Africa. They have small green leaves 1.5–4 cm long, and a leathery multicoloured trunk. The flowers are small and inconspicuous; the fruit is a small edible drupe 1 cm diameter.

The genus is named after the French botanist Augustin Sageret.

Selected species
Sageretia brandrethiana
Sageretia camellifolia
Sageretia filiformis
Sageretia gracilis
Sageretia hamosa
Sageretia henryi
Sageretia horrida
Sageretia laxiflora
Sageretia lucida
Sageretia melliana
Sageretia omeiensis
Sageretia paucicostata
Sageretia pycnophylla
Sageretia randaiensis
Sageretia rugosa
Sageretia subcaudata
Sageretia theezans

Cultivation and uses
The leaves are sometimes used as a substitute for tea in China, and the fruit are edible, though not an important crop. S. theezans, from southern China, is a popular species in bonsai. S. paucicostata, from northern China, is the most cold-tolerant species and is occasionally grown in gardens in Europe and North America, though it is not generally considered very attractive as an ornamental plant. It is reputedly used as a way of cleaning minor cuts and lacerations, ensuring any germs left over will not infect the wound.

References

 
Rhamnaceae genera
Taxa named by Adolphe-Théodore Brongniart